Ramanlal C. Mehta (31 October 1918 – 18 October 2014) was an Indian musician and musicologist. In 2009, he was awarded the Padma Bhushan, India's third-highest civilian honour.

Life
Ramanlal was a Gujarati who was born on 31 October 1918 in Surat in the state of Gujarat. He retired in 1978, from the MS University of Baroda, after serving as Principal of the College of Indian Music, Dance & Dramatics / Faculty of Performing Arts for several years. He died after a fall in 2014 at the age of 95.

Musical career
He was trained in Hindustani classical vocal music by Kanchalal Manawala and later followed the Kirana style of Ustad Abdul Waheed Khan. He was with All India Radio for 9 years (1945–1953) prior to his taking up principal-ship of the Baroda Music College.  A vocalist of the Kirana Gharana Style, he developed his own style in Khyal and Thumri and gave several vocal concerts of Hindustani Classical Music in music circles, at music conferences and over All India Radio. He composed and produced more than fifty musical dramas and features  over A.I.R., Bombay, Ahmedabad  and Baroda (1945–1953).

Academic
Mehta worked in music education in India for over 45 years, serving as an expert member at national and state institutions and universities.  He founded the Indian Musicological Society in 1970 and later served the society as honorary General Secretary.  He served as editor of the Journal of the Indian Musicological Society, since its 1970 inception, retiring in 2005.  He also served as an expert member on the Central Music Audition Board (MAB) of All India Radio. On his suggestion, the first-ever conference on distance education in Indian Classical Music was organised by Ustad Alauddin Khan Sangeet Academy. He also published a collection of papers presented as Distance Education in Music.

Author and critic
He wrote and published on various aspects of music.  His publications include :
(1) Agra-Parampara, Gayaki Aur Chizen (Hindi) Pub. By the M.S. University,
(2) Sangeet Charcha 1963 (Guj.) (Music Criticism)
(3) Guajarati Geya Kavita (Guj.) 1954 (Song Form in Gujarati Literature)

Mehta also published several research papers in scholarly journals.

Awards and honours
Prof. Mehta is the recipient of many awards, which include :
An honorary degree of Doctor of Music by the Akhil Bharatiya Ghandarva Mahavidyalaya Mandal (1967)
State Award for Music by the Govt. of Gujarat (1978)
Emeritus Fellowship of the Ministry of Education and Culture, Govt. of India (1983)
Sarangadeva Fellowship – by Sursingar Samsad, (1988)
SRA – ITC award for Distinguished and lifelong services to the cause of Hindustani Music (1990)
 “Shrestha Sangeeracharya” Award by Pt. Bhatkhande Institute of Music and Musicology, Raipur (M.P.)( 1993 )
Swar Sadhna Ratna award by Swar Sadhana Samiti - Bombay (1995 )
Kaka Hathrasi Sangeet Sanmaan by Kaka Hathrasi Puraskar Trust – Hathras (U.P.) (2001)
Centenary Celebration honour for Life Time Contribution to Music by Bangalore Gayana Samaja – Bangalore (2005)
Sangeet Natak Akademi Fellowship (2008)
Padma Bhushan (2009)
Pt. Omkar Nath Thakur Award (2010) by the Government of Gujarat.
Sangeetvikas Award (2011) instituted by Samakalika Sangeetham, a Journal dedicated for Indian Classical Music, for the book, Indian Classical Music & Gharana Tradition (Read Worthy Publications (P) Ltd, New Delhi)
 An honorary degree of Doctor of Literature awarded by Indira Kala Sangeet Vishwavidyalaya, Khairagarh. (2014)

References
The latest biographical note on R. C. Mehta written by Dr. Bhalchandra Panchakshari, Retired Reader, Indira Kala Sangeet Vishwavidyalaya, Khairagarh was published in Hindi periodical “Sangeet Kala Vihar”, July 2006 issue, pages 13, 14, 15 & 16.

External links
Works by R.C. Mehta
Bhatkhande Memorial Lecture Series - Edited by R.C. Mehta

1918 births
2014 deaths
Hindustani singers
Indian musicologists
Indian music educators
Recipients of the Padma Bhushan in arts
Recipients of the Sangeet Natak Akademi Fellowship
People from Vadodara
People from Surat
Academic staff of Maharaja Sayajirao University of Baroda
20th-century Indian musicians
Gujarati people
Musicians from Gujarat